Justo Pastor Lynch (1755–1830), an Argentine landowner, was born in Buenos Aires on the family "estancia", a ranch by the River de la Plata. He was the eldest surviving son of Patrick Lynch of Lydican Castle in Claregalway Ireland, and Rosa de Galaya de la Camera. At times his name was recorded as Pastorin or Pastorino Lynch in reference to the large pastoral land owned by his family dedicated to horses and livestock.

Descendants
Justo's fortune was one of the largest in the region, properties, and business he received from his family, in addition, he married the Spanish heiress Ana Bernardo Roo (d.1836), who doubled the extent and value of his properties; consequently, his sons enjoyed a wealthy life like no other Irish immigrants in the region.

His eldest son Patricio (Patrick) Lynch, born 1789, set up a shipping company. He owned the frigate, Heroína, which was involved in a claim of possession of the Falkland Islands in 1820. Patricio Lynch is the great great grandfather of Che Guevara.

Another son Estanislao Lynch, born 1793, fought in the Argentine independence war with the grade of colonel. On 2 January 1817 the Buenos Aires city council appointed Estanislao as the mayor of Barracas.

References
 Coghlan, Eduardo A., Los Irlandeses en la Argentina: Su Actuación y Descendencia (Buenos Aires, 1987), p. 626.
 Buenos Aires City Council, Archivo General de la Nación, Series IV, Vol. VII, Sections LXXIV to LXXIX, 1816 and 1817 (Buenos Aires, 1930).
 Dictionary of Irish Latin American Biography, by Gonzalo Cané

People from Buenos Aires
Irish expatriates in Argentina
1830 deaths
1755 births